Pepsin B (parapepsin I, pig gelatinase) is an enzyme. This enzyme catalyses the following chemical reaction

 Degradation of gelatin, with manor activity on hemoglobin. Specificity for B chain of insulin is more restricted than that of pepsin A

This enzyme is formed from pig pepsinogen B.

See also 
 Pepsin

References

External links 
 

EC 3.4.23